Genetic Sequencing may refer to:

 DNA sequencing
 Whole genome sequencing